Thecla, Tecla, or its variants (Thékla,  "God's fame") is a Greek feminine given name made famous by Saint Thecla (Thecla of Iconium), a 1st-century Christian martyr.

It may also refer to:

People
 Thecla of Alexandria, virgin, martyr, saint, and companion of Faustus, Abibus and Dionysius of Alexandria
 Thecla of Aquileia, one of a group of virgins from Aquileia, Italy, martyred in the 1st century according to the "Acts of St. Hermagoras"
 Thecla of Gaza, Christian martyr with Agapius (died 306)
 Thecla of Kitzingen, a saint 
 Thecla of Persia (4th century), martyr
 Saint Tetha ( century), virgin and saint, a Welsh nun credited with the establishment of St. Teath in Cornwall
 Princess Thecla of Georgia (1776–1846), member of the Georgian royal family
 Thecla Åhlander (1855–1925), Swedish stage and film actress 
 Thecla Boesen (1910–1996), Danish film actress
 Thecla Merlo (born Teresa Merlo), theologian who assisted in the founding and development of the Daughters of St. Paul in the 20th century
 Thecla Valloires, a 6th-century hermit

Places 
 Municipality of Sainte-Thècle, Quebec, Canada

Churches 
 Cathedral of St. Thecla, the original Milan Cathedral
 St. Tecla's Chapel at Tarragona Cathedral in Spain
 Church of St. Thecla Welden, at Welden in Germany
 Church of St. Thecla, Quebec, Canada

Other uses
 Thecla (butterfly), a butterfly genus

See also
 
 

 Thekla (disambiguation)
 Tecla
 Theca, in botany and developmental biology, a case, covering, or sheath
 Tekla, software company
 Takla (disambiguation)